Holas Radzimy is a newspaper published in Belarus.

Newspapers published in Belarus